Ilir Shulku (born 21 January 1969) is an Albanian retired professional footballer, who played the majority of his career for Partizani Tirana.

Club career
Shulku had a three-month spell with Apollon Athens in the Greek Alpha Ethniki and played one and a half season for German Regionalliga side Eintracht Nordhorn.

International career
Shulku made his debut for the Albania national team in a February 1993 FIFA World Cup qualification match against Northern Ireland and earned a total of 40 caps, scoring one goal. His final international was an October 1999 European Championship qualification match against Georgia.

Personal life
Shulku is married to Evis and they have two children. He has been general secretary of the Albanian FA since November 2012.

Career statistics

Honours
Partizani
 Albanian Superliga: 1993

References

External links

1971 births
Living people
Footballers from Tirana
Albanian footballers
Association football defenders
Albania international footballers
FK Partizani Tirana players
Apollon Smyrnis F.C. players
Eintracht Nordhorn players
Kategoria Superiore players
Albanian football managers
Kategoria Superiore managers
FK Partizani Tirana managers
Besa Kavajë managers
Albanian expatriate footballers
Expatriate footballers in Greece
Albanian expatriate sportspeople in Greece
Expatriate footballers in Germany
Albanian expatriate sportspeople in Germany